The Delhi Territory was an administrative region in British India which comprised present-day Delhi plus Bhiwani, Faridabad, Fatehabad,  Gurgaon, Hisar, Jhajjar, Karnal, Nuh, Palwal, Panipat, Rewari, Rohtak, Sirsa, Sonipat     and Yamunanagar districts of Haryana.

History

Until 1832, the Delhi Division was controlled by the Residency. Regulation V of that year, abolished the office of Resident and annexed the Delhi territory to the jurisdiction of the Sadr Board and Courts of Justice at Allahabad, which included the Commissioner of the Delhi territory and all officers acting under his control, ordinarily to "or form to the principles and spirit of the regulations" in their his control, ordinarily to administration.

After the Indian rebellion of 1857, the Delhi Division of the North-Western Provinces was transferred to the Punjab in 1858, and formed into the Delhi and Hissar divisions, which embraced the six districts of Ambala, Delhi, Gurgaon, Hissar, Karnal and Rohtak.

See also
Company rule in India
British Raj
United Provinces of Agra and Oudh

Notes

Divisions of British India
Historical Indian regions
History of Delhi
History of Haryana
19th century in Delhi
1803 establishments in the British Empire